Callicercops triceros is a moth of the family Gracillariidae. It is known from Mauritius, Namibia, Réunion, Zambia, Zimbabwe and South Africa.

Hostplant of this species is Bauhinia monandra (Fabaceae).

References

Gracillariinae
Lepidoptera of South Africa
Lepidoptera of Zambia
Lepidoptera of Zimbabwe
Moths of Réunion
Moths of Sub-Saharan Africa
Moths described in 1926
Moths of Mauritius